icelolly.com, part of icelolly Marketing Limited, is a UK-based holiday price comparison website and deals platform. With more than 20 million visitors each year, it generates over 40m search queries.

History 
The company was founded in December 2005 by entrepreneurs Adrian Walton and Lesley Etienne. In 2013, the company underwent a management buyout backed by Palatine Private Equity for £17 million. Since then, icelolly.com has relocated their offices from Wyke, Bradford to Leeds city centre, West Yorkshire.

Andrew Latham replaced outgoing CEO Dave Clayton on an interim basis in May 2014 and got a permanent position in December of that year. That same year the business was rebranded, with a logo and website makeover.

In December 2017, former Travelzoo president Richard Singer was appointed CEO.

Awards 
Icelolly.com was said to be the UK's fastest growing holiday comparison website in 2018.

In March 2019, they won 'Travel Brand (<£25m turnover)' and were awarded second place for overall 'Travel Brand' at The Travel Marketing Awards. The year also saw the company win 'Best Website' at the Northern Digital Awards 2019, where they were also shortlisted for 'Best Digital Marketing Campaign – Travel / Leisure' .

icelolly.com's Perfect Package ad won the Travel Marketing Award for ‘Best Budget TV Advert’ in 2012.

Product 
In January 2019, icelolly.com announced the relaunch of its web platform across desktop, mobile and IOS/Android. The site now features a unified ‘app-like’ look on all platforms, incorporating bold colours and aspirational background images. The homepage features prominent drop-down menus and an easy-to-use mega navigation menu that highlights all deal collections.

Following Black Friday success in late 2016, a Deals subsection of the site was launched, whereby a selection of handpicked holiday offers were listed. This platform was fully updated in summer 2018, with an all new contemporary layout and colourful imagery, to include segmented deal types and curated offers designed to further enhance the user experience.

Sponsorship and advertising campaigns 
In 2018 icelolly.com recently announced a 15-month partnership deal with ITV in order to supercharge growth and strengthen its position as one of the UK's leading travel brands. The company's presence across the network will begin on Boxing Day 2018 with the launch of an all-new TV ad on ITV, with sponsorship of ITV2 Evenings and ITV3 Afternoons set to follow from January 2019. This partnership deal lasted until November 2019.

The company's multi-platform marketing initiatives in 2018, included a partnership with McDonald's for its popular Monopoly prize-winning game, regional weather report sponsorship across Capital Radio stations, TV sponsorship and online and social media-driven activities such as the #ShutTheCupUp World Cup competition.

That year saw icelolly.com sponsor 'Change Your Tune,' 'Dickinson's Real Deal' and STV's 'Judge Rinder' on ITV. The company partnered with ITV back in 2013, and has since provided holiday prizes to popular TV game shows, including 'Ant & Dec's Saturday Night Takeaway' and 'Catchphrase.'

In August 2015, the company launched a new advertising campaign under the strap line "Compare. Call. Save", the centre of which is a video advert featuring an ice cream van and a squirrel. The advert was first launched on YouTube before making its television debut on Boxing Day 2015.

In Summer 2011, icelolly.com ran a tongue-in-cheek commercial, featuring a female heroine relaxing by a pool while surreptitiously ‘checking out’ four male stereotypes, with Hot Chocolate's You Sexy Thing playing in the background and a voice over from Gavin and Stacey's Joanna Page.

References 

Comparison shopping websites
Internet properties established in 2005